"A Whole New World" is the signature song from Disney's 1992 animated feature film Aladdin, with music by Alan Menken and lyrics by Tim Rice. A duet originally recorded by singers Brad Kane and Lea Salonga in their respective roles as the singing voices of the main characters Aladdin and Jasmine, the ballad serves as both the film's love and theme song. Lyrically, "A Whole New World" describes Aladdin showing the confined princess a life of freedom and the pair's acknowledgment of their love for each other while riding on a magic carpet. The song garnered an Academy Award for Best Original Song at the 65th Academy Awards and a Golden Globe Award for Best Original Song at the 50th Golden Globe Awards. "A Whole New World" also won the Grammy Awards for Best Song Written Specifically for a Motion Picture or for Television at the 36th Annual Grammy Awards, as well as Song of the Year, the only Disney song to do so (as of 2023). In the same year, the version sung by Peabo Bryson and Regina Belle was also nominated for Record of the Year and Best Pop Performance by a Duo or Group With Vocals, winning the latter.

Zayn Malik and Zhavia Ward did their version of the song for the live action version of Aladdin (2019). The music video featuring Zayn Malik and Zhavia Ward was directed by Philip Andelman, photographed by David Devlin and supported the successful release of the 2019 live action feature film Aladdin directed by Guy Ritchie.

Peabo Bryson and Regina Belle version 

A single version of the song was released that same year and was performed by American recording artists Peabo Bryson and Regina Belle. This version is played over the film's end credits and is referred on the soundtrack as "Aladdin'''s Theme". The version peaked at number one on the US Billboard Hot 100 chart for a week, ending on March 6, 1993, replacing Whitney Houston's "I Will Always Love You", which had spent a then-record 14 weeks at the top of the chart. It went gold and sold 600,000 copies domestically. The track peaked at number 12 in the UK Singles Chart in 1993. The song is the first song from a Disney animated film to top the US Billboard Hot 100. It was the only Disney song to achieve this feat until "We Don't Talk About Bruno" from Encanto reached the summit in 2022. The single version was later included on Belle's studio album Passion (1993) and on Bryson's studio album Through the Fire (1994).

Critical reception
Alan Jones from Music Week gave the song five out of five. He wrote, "The theme from Aladdin is a huge appealing big ballad duet. A melodic tour de force with wide ranging appeal, it is wisely tipped as the Christmas number one."

Charts

Weekly charts

Year-end charts

Certifications

Cover versions
 Lea Salonga and Jose Mari Chan version 

In the Philippines, a version of the song performed by Lea Salonga and Jose Mari Chan, both Filipino recording artists, was released as a single through Bell Films (a subsidiary of Universal Records) in 1993, coinciding with the Philippine theatrical release of Aladdin on April 30, 1993.

Then-SM Rookies member Jaehyun, who later debuted as a member of boy group NCT and former member Seo Herin performed the song in Disney Channel Korea show Mickey Mouse Club in December 2015.

 Other notable cover versions 
 In 2007, Pixar employee Nick Pitera uploaded a video to YouTube where he performs both the male and female characters, earning 30 million views by January 2013.
 In 2018, Riff Raff and Jonathan Hay created a hip-hop cover of the song for the album The Hoodlum Ball''.
 Malik's English vocals were also used for two English-Spanish versions of the song, "Un mundo ideal". The Spanish parts were sung for the Latin American market by American singer Becky G and for the Spanish market by Spanish singer Aitana.

See also
List of Hot 100 number-one singles of 1993 (U.S.)
List of number-one adult contemporary singles of 1993 (U.S.)
List of Mainstream Top 40 number-one hits of 1993 (U.S.)

References

External links
 

1992 singles
1992 songs
1990s ballads
Best Original Song Golden Globe winning songs
Best Original Song Academy Award-winning songs
Billboard Hot 100 number-one singles
Columbia Records singles
Contemporary R&B ballads
Disney Renaissance songs
Grammy Award for Best Song Written for Visual Media
Grammy Award for Song of the Year
Jose Mari Chan songs
Katie Price songs
Lea Salonga songs
Love themes
Male–female vocal duets
Mena Massoud songs
Peabo Bryson songs
Peter Andre songs
Pop ballads
Regina Belle songs
Ricardo Montaner songs
Song recordings produced by Alan Menken
Song recordings produced by Walter Afanasieff
Songs from Aladdin (franchise)
Songs with lyrics by Tim Rice
Songs with music by Alan Menken
Soul ballads
Walt Disney Records singles
Zayn Malik songs
Zhavia Ward songs